Pertensive marking is to head-marking languages what possessive marking is to dependent-marking languages. For example, English, a dependent-marking language has a person's rodent, where the head is rodent and the possessive marking is on the dependent person's. In contrast, Shilluk has a pertensive affix on the head (e.g., dúup = "rodent", dû́uup = "rodent belonging to"). Other languages with pertensive marking are Nungon, Hungarian, Mansi, and Khanty. Some languages, such as Martuthunira employ both possessive and pertensive marking.

The term was coined by Dixon in 2011.

References 

Grammatical cases